Dhanam is a Malayalam film released in 1991. Directed by Sibi Malayil, this film had a strong casting line including Mohanlal, Murali, Thilakan, Nedumudi Venu, Charmila, Zeenath and Kaviyoor Ponnamma. The script was done by A. K. Lohithadas. The film features a musical score by Johnson and songs by Raveendran.

Plot
Sivasankaran Nair is a young aspiring middle class medical representative with his home and other properties under mortgage (for a loan taken by his expired father). He lives with his mother and sister. His dream is to earn more money and build a bigger home after repaying the loans. His neighbor and his close childhood friend is Abubecker. He is a taxi driver and both of them are intimate friends. Sivasankar usually travels with his friend. On one occasion, they accept a trip to carry a dead body at night for more money. While returning, the taxi breaks down near a beach and they decide to spend the night in the car until morning when the will be able to repair the car and resume the journey. Sivasankar gets a dream where in the corpse comes alive and asks for a match. Sivasankar convinces Abu that the car smells of the corpse and they decide to stay on the beach. Coincidentally, they overhear a smuggler trio talking about why they were not able to deliver the goods today. They tip the Customs department to get a monetary reward. After the Customs department catches the smugglers red-handed, they get a reward of 20 lakhs. But the smuggler Stephen who lost the gold, learns about the informer from inside sources. He wants to kill the informer for the loss. His associates try to kill both Sivasankar and Abu on their return from receiving the reward.

They decide to stay in a Hotel with the money before depositing it in a bank. Sivasankar unknowingly stays in the same hotel of Stephen's, whereas Abu returns home. On seeing Sivasankar accidentally, Stephen and his henchmen try to kill him. Sivasankar runs with money for cover. In the end of the fight, they shoot Sivasankar when he jumps of a bridge into a river.

Local Police constable Rajappan, a lecher lives with his wife Lekshmi and his sister-in-law Thangam/ Snehalatha. Bullet injured Sivasankar resurfaces in their upper balcony of home. When she runs for cover from a sexual advance of her sister's husband Thangam sees Sivasankar and helps  him to hide. She feeds him and helps him to remove his bullet. They both get to know each other. Sivasankar tells his story to Thangam and that after struggling for life and food for 3 days in hiding, he realises the value of life and the idiocy in running behind money. He also tells that it is because of her compassion and empathy that he survived. Meanwhile, Police Constable Rajappan batters his wife over a missing alcohol bottle which was used for Sivasankar while removing the Bullet. Stephen reaches Sivasankar's house to enquire about him. He reaches to Abu on information from Sivasnakar's brother.

Stephen enquires about Sivasankar and Abu replies that their aim was only making some money and he won't reveal the whereabouts of Sivan, even if he dies. Stephen lets him go and follows him. Sivan sends a Letter via Thangam to Abu for a meeting. Thangam's father slaps her on return for going away without informing the family members and coming home late. Thangam manages to pass the message from Sivan. Abu comes to meet Sivan in the cover of darkness. Sivan explains his position that he never ran with the money. Abu says him that he believes him and doesn't want the money and informs him on arranging a train ticket the next day for leaving the place with the money. Sivan asks Abu to take care of his family. Before leaving, Thangam asks Sivan to take her along with him to escape her brother-in-law. In the middle of the night, Rajappan arrives home and on seeing  Thangam alone, he tries to take advantage of her. Sivan interferes and saves her. On seeing the fight, furious Thangam's father attacks Rajappan and sends him out of the house. Sivasankaran leaves to railway station with a promise of returning to marry Thangam.

Whilst Stephen was losing patience, he asks Abu about Sivan's whereabouts. He refuses to divulge the information and Abu is murdered. On the way to the railway station, Sivasankar finds the taxi with Abu's dead body inside. Stephen and his associates attack him. In retaliation, Sivan kills Stephen. The movie ends with a devastated Sivasankar holding his friend's dead body and open briefcase of Money (Dhanam) that is flying around.

Cast

Mohanlal as Sivasankaran Nair
Murali as Aboobacker/Abu
Charmila as Thankam/Snehalatha
Nassar as Stephen
Kaviyoor Ponnamma as Sivasankarans mother
Thilakan as Thankams father
Nedumudi Venu as Rajappan
Zeenath as Lekshmi ,Rajappan's wife
Babu Namboothiri as Balan
Oduvil Unnikrishnan as Menon
Santha Devi as Aboobacker's mother
Indrans as Sasidharan

Music
The score was composed by Johnson and the songs of this film were composed by Raveendran, with lyrics penned by P. K. Gopi.

Box office

Dhanam was a superhit and one of the highest-grosser Malayalam films of 1991.

References

External links
 

1991 films
1991 drama films
1990s Malayalam-language films
Indian drama films
Films shot in Palakkad
Films shot in Kozhikode
Films directed by Sibi Malayil
Films with screenplays by A. K. Lohithadas